The Oxford-Burcot Commission was the first Commission concerned with the management of the River Thames, appointed by an Act of Parliament of 1605 by James I to make the stretch of river from Burcot to Oxford navigable. The Commission took responsibility for the management of the River Thames between Oxford and Burcot. It consisted of 18 members, including a representative each from Oxford city and from the University. However its work was irregular and by 1611 it had ceased altogether.

A second strengthened Act of Parliament in 1623 allowed for the appointment of eight commissioners of sewers. This was also known as the Oxford-Burcot Commission. It had the power to tax Oxford city and the university, to clean the river and to install locks and weirs. Iffley Lock, Sandford Lock and a lock on the Swift Ditch near the present Abingdon Lock were  built in 1631. However, its work was slow and costly and the first barge did not reach Oxford until 1635.

Consequently Thames Navigation Commissioners were appointed in 1751 by a further Act of Parliament under King George II in 1751. This commission had similar powers but covered the entire length of the River Thames down to Staines.

See also
Locks on the River Thames

References

Defunct public bodies of the United Kingdom
History of Oxford
1605 establishments in England
1611 disestablishments
1623 establishments in England
History of the River Thames
1751 disestablishments in Great Britain